Chantia is a genus of mites in the Phytoseiidae family.

Species
 Chantia paradoxa Pritchard & Baker, 1962

References

Phytoseiidae
Acari genera